A sanction may be either a permission or a restriction, depending upon context, as the word is an auto-antonym.

Examples of sanctions include:

Government and law
 Sanctions (law), penalties imposed by courts
 Economic sanctions, typically a ban on trade, possibly limited to certain sectors (such as armaments), or with certain exceptions (such as food and medicine), e.g.,
 Sanctions against Iran
 Sanctions against North Korea
 International sanctions, coercive measures adopted by a country or a group of countries against another state or individual(s) in order to elicit a change in their behavior
 International sanctions during the Russo-Ukrainian War
 Pragmatic sanction, historically, a sovereign's solemn decree which addresses a matter of primary importance and which has the force of fundamental law

Arts, entertainment, and media
The Eiger Sanction, a 1972 thriller novel by Trevanian, the pen name of Rodney William Whitaker
The Eiger Sanction (film), the 1975 film adaptation of Trevanian's novel
The Loo Sanction, Trevanian's 1973 sequel to The Eiger Sanction
Account Sanctions, a punishment in Star Wars: The Old Republic.

Other uses
 Sanctions, a mechanism of social control

See also

 Sanctions involving Russia
 Sanctioned name, a special name in mycology
 Wikipedia:Sanctions